Pajaka is a village in Udupi Taluk and district of Karnataka state in India. Pajaka is the place where Dvaita philosopher Sri Madhvacharya was born.  The place is near Kunjarugiri Durga temple. 

The importance of Pajaka kshetra is also narrated in a small biographical poem called "Sampradaya Paddhati", whose author is Sri Madhvacharya's direct disciple Sri Hrushikesha, the mula yati of Sri Palimaru Mata.

Sri Vadiraja swamy of the Sode Mata in his "Tirtha prabandha" explains Pajaka Kshetra as a very holy place, because it was here Sri Mukyaprana was born as Sri Madhvacharya and hence it has to be visited all wise men.

There is an impression of Sri Madhvacharya's feet near his house. Sri Vadiraja swamy later installed an idol of Sri Madhvacharya there, which is now a temple and where he is worshipped by devotees till date.

Places to see
There are many interesting places to see at Pajaka. Perhaps the most important of all is the ancestral home and birthplace of Sri Madhva. There are many archaeological evidences of the life and times of Sri Madhva at this place. This includes the spot where his Aksharabhyasa (Initiation Ceremony) was performed, a banyan tree supposed to have been planted by him, the place where Sri Madhva (by virtue of being an avatar of Vayu) lifted two huge stones and placed them on pots, and a pond where Sri Madhva is supposed to have brought the water from 4 nearby ponds (Dhanus Theertha, Gada Theertha, Bana Theertha and Parashu Theertha).

There is also a Madhva Mandira very close to the house. Lot of religious activities happen here and it is also a Vidyapeeta where students learn Vedas and Sanskrit. The entire complex is managed by Sri Kaniyooru Matha, one of the eight mathas Sri Madhva established.

The Kunjaragiri Durga temple is also a fascinating place to visit. The temple is located on top of a hill and the hill offers some breathtaking sceneries of Udupi. There is also a Parashurama temple nearby.

External links
Photos of Pajaka and brief description 
Photos of Pajaka
Comprehensive information on Udupi
 Pajaka

Villages in Udupi district